The Andorra women's national basketball team represents Andorra in international women's basketball competitions.

Competitive record

Championship for Small Countries

References

External links
Basketball Federation of Andorra (official website)

Women's national basketball teams
National sports teams of Andorra
Basketball in Andorra